The 1980 Torneo Descentralizado was the sixty-fourth season of Peruvian football. A total of 16 teams competed in the tournament. The season was divided into two phases. Sporting Cristal won its seventh first division title and fifth national title.

Format
The first stage of the tournament involves all sixteen teams playing against each other, once at home and once away. When this stage concluded, the top four teams advanced to an end-of-season playoff phase known as the Liguilla to determine the national champion. Relegation was determined by the bottom four teams of the first stage in a four-team group. The fourth-placed team was relegated and the third-placed team played a promotion/relegation playoff with the 1980 Copa Perú runner-up. The teams carried their first stage results into the Liguilla and relegation group except the sixteenth placed team which were docked 2 points for placing last.

Teams

First stage

Final Group

Relegation Group

Relegation play-off

External links
RSSSF Peru 1980

Peru
Peruvian Primera División seasons
1980 in Peruvian football